Beacons is a 2009 album by Toronto, Ontario, Canada-based indie band Ohbijou. Three of the tracks, including "Jailbird Blues", were recorded during the Banff Centre Indie Band Residency.

Track listing

 Intro to Season – 2:34
 Wildfires – 3:50
 Black Ice – 3:41
 Cliff Jumps – 5:03
 Cannon March – 4:47
 Eloise & the Bones – 2:59
 Thunderlove – 3:42
 New Years – 2:57
 Make It Gold – 4:44
 We Lovers – 4:54
 Memoriam – 5:44
 Jailbird Blues – 2:54

References

External links
 BBC Review

2009 albums
Ohbijou albums